House Tornado is an album by the alternative rock band Throwing Muses.  Produced by Gary Smith and engineered by Paul Q. Kolderie, it was recorded at Fort Apache Studios in Cambridge, MA.  The album was released in 1988 internationally on the 4AD label, except in the United States, where it was released by Sire Records.  Sire used a different album cover for its release, as the label was putting a strong promotional push behind the band, and label executives favored a picture of the band over the collage featured on the 4AD release.

The 4AD CD release also features six of the seven tracks from the band's 1987 EP The Fat Skier.  (The seventh track was not deemed essential for CD release, as it was a re-issue of "Soul Soldier" from the band's debut album, followed by an ambient field recording of the band talking in a park.)  The Sire release did not feature these six songs, and therefore these songs have never been released on CD in the US.

Track listing 
All songs written by Kristin Hersh except "The River" and "Giant" written by Tanya Donelly

 "Colder"  – 3:19
 "Mexican Women"  – 2:46
 "The River"  – 3:57
 "Juno"  – 2:03
 "Marriage Tree"  – 3:00
 "Run Letter"  – 5:02
 "Saving Grace"  – 2:38
 "Drive"  – 3:25
 "Downtown"  – 4:03
 "Giant"  – 3:53
 "Walking in the Dark"  – 4:39

Additional songs on the 4AD release. All songs written by Kristin Hersh except "Pools in Eyes" written by Tanya Donelly
<li> "Garoux des larmes"  – 2:37
<li> "Pools in Eyes"  – 3:20
<li> "A Feeling"  – 3:09
<li> "Soap and Water"  – 2:26
<li> "And a She-Wolf After the War"  – 3:31
<li> "You Cage"  – 1:41

Personnel 
Throwing Muses
 Kristin Hersh - guitars, vocals, piano
 Tanya Donelly - guitars, vocals, percussion
 Leslie Langston - bass, backing vocals, percussion
 David Narcizo - drums, backing vocals, percussion

References

1988 albums
Throwing Muses albums
Albums produced by Gary Smith (record producer)
Sire Records albums
4AD albums